Polyommatus admetus, the anomalous blue, is a butterfly of the family Lycaenidae. It was described by Eugenius Johann Christoph Esper in 1783. It is found in south-eastern Europe and Turkey.

The wingspan is 30–40 mm. Adults are on wing from June to August.

The larvae feed on Onobrychis species  (including O. viciifolia) and Lathyrus species.

Description from Seitz

L. admetus Esp. (81 e). Male and female above dull dark brown, without metallic blue or aeneous gloss; the discocellular spot of the forewing and the black veins mostly distinctly contrasting. The hindwing, especially of the female, bears often obsolescent reddish anal spots. Underside somewhat paler brown than upper, with distinct ocelli, but no basal ocelli on the forewing. In South-East Europe, from Hungary and Galicia through the Balkan Peninsula and Asia Minor to Mesopotamia; also in Spain. — ripartii Frr. (81 f), has on the hindwing below a white mesial streak which extends from the base to the outer margin. More  widely distributed than admetus, being found in the Alps, South France, in eastern Europe, Asia Minor, Persia and Turkestan. — Egg at first greenish, later on white. Larva on Onobrychis cristagalli. The butterflies are on the wing in June and July and fly on slopes with sparse vegetation, settling particularly on lavender. They are plentiful in most places where they occur.

Subspecies
Polyommatus admetus admetus (south-eastern Europe)
Polyommatus admetus anatoliensis (Forster, 1960) (Turkey)

References

Butterflies described in 1783
Polyommatus
Butterflies of Europe
Butterflies of Asia